Relax - Edition Four is the tenth studio album by Trance duo Blank & Jones. It was released on 17 April 2009.  Soundcolours # SC 0109, Double CD, Digi-pak.

Track listing
CD1 - Sun
"Face À La Mer" - 6:25
"Happy Dreamer (Blank & Jones Relax Mix)" - feat. Laid Back - 4:54
"Nuits Blanches" - 4:06
"Relax (Your Mind)" - feat. Jason Caesar - 6:12 
"Chilled Cream" - 6:56
"Try Again (Blank & Jones Relax Mix)" - feat. Keane - 5:18
"Heart Of Wax (Late Night Mix)" - feat. Vanessa Daou - 4:47
"Smooth" - 4:22
"Up 2 You" - feat. Laid Back - 5:39
"Blue Moon" - 5:10
"Pure" - 6:10
"Consequences (Late Night Mix)" - feat. Vanessa Daou - 8:01
"Lullaby (Les Yeux Fermes)" - 5:51

CD2 - Moon  	  
"Where You Belong (Poolside House Mix)" - feat. Bobo - 7:05
"Lazy Life" - 5:19
"Listen To My Heartbeat" - feat. Laid Back - 5:55
"Butterfisch" - 9:08
"Do It" - feat. Mike Francis - 7:08
"El Verano" - 7:43
"Relax (Your Mind) (Boutique Mix)" - feat. Jason Caesar - 6:00
"Fierce People" - 5:01
"Beauty" - 5:31
"Every Day Every Night" - 4:37

Blank & Jones albums
2009 albums